Pišanje uz vetar (trans. Pissing Against the Wind) is the fifteenth studio album from Serbian and former Yugoslav rock band Riblja Čorba, released in 2001.

Reggae tracks "Crno beli svet" and "Crno beli svet (I opet)" featured Eyesburn frontman Nemanja Kojić on vocals and trombone. The track "Srbin je lud" featured Dejan Cukić on backing vocals. "Prokockan život" i "Čekajući čoveka" featured Marija Mihajlović on vocals. Balkan brass band tracks "Po livadi rosnoj" and "Hoću, majko, hoću" featured Boban Marković trumpet orchestra. "Zašto sam otišao blues" features the band's guitarist Vidoja Božinović's brother Zoran Božinović on solo guitar. "Čekajući čoveka" features the actor Josif Tatić.

The song, "Daj mi lovu", is a cover of The Who song "Boris the Spider" (although written by John Entwistle, on Pišanje uz vetar it was credited to Pete Townshend).

Album cover
The album cover was designed by Jugoslav Vlahović.

Track listing

Personnel
Bora Đorđević - vocals
Vidoja Božinović - guitar
Miša Aleksić - bass guitar, producer
Vicko Milatović - drums
Vladimir Barjaktarević - keyboards, engineer

Additional personnel
Nemanja Kojić - vocals, trombone (on tracks: 1, 14)
Marija Mihajlović - vocals, backing vocals (on tracks: 10, 11)
Dejan Cukić - backing vocals (on track 2)
Željko Savić - backing vocals (on track 9)
Zoran Božinović - guitar (solo on track 12)
Josif Tatić - speech
St George String Orchestra (on tracks: 4, 5):
Goran Uzelac - violin
Miroslav Lazić - violin
Ivana Uzelac - viola
Mirjana Crnojević - viola
Mileta Stanković - cello
Dušan Stojanović - cello
Boban Marković trumpet orchestra (on tracks: 6, 7):
Boban Marković
Jovica Ajdarević
Srđan Spasić
Momčilo Krstić
Dragoljub Eminović
Selistar Eminović
Ašim Ajdanović
Srđan Eminović
Saša Ališanović
Dragoljub Eminović
Neđat Zuberović
Ašmet Eminović
Milan Popović - producer
Oliver Jovanović - engineer
Dino Dolničar - recorded by

References 

Pišanje uz vetar at Discogs
 EX YU ROCK enciklopedija 1960-2006,  Janjatović Petar;  
 Riblja čorba,  Jakovljević Mirko;

External links 
Pišanje uz vetar at Discogs

Riblja Čorba albums
2001 albums
Hi-Fi Centar albums